Antakrddaaśāh is the eighth of the 12 Jain āgamas said to be promulgated by Māhavīra himself. Antakrddaaśāh  translated as "Ten Chapters on End-Makers" is said to have been composed by Ganadhara Sudharmaswami as per the Śvetámbara tradition.

It contains stories describing those who succeeded in destroying all their karmas and succeeded in attaining Moksa and putting an end to the re-births.

Jain texts